The 1925 Tour de France was the 19th edition of Tour de France, one of cycling's Grand Tours. The Tour began in Paris with a flat stage on 21 June, and Stage 9 occurred on 3 July with a mountainous stage to Perpignan. The race finished in Paris on 19 July.

Stage 1
21 June 1925 — Paris to Le Havre,

Stage 2
23 June 1925 — Le Havre to Cherbourg-en-Cotentin,

Stage 3
25 June 1925 — Cherbourg-en-Cotentin to Brest,

Stage 4
26 June 1925 — Brest to Vannes,

Stage 5
27 June 1925 — Vannes to Les Sables-d'Olonne,

Stage 6
28 June 1925 — Les Sables-d'Olonne to Bordeaux,

Stage 7
29 June 1925 — Bordeaux to Bayonne,

Stage 8
1 July 1925 — Bayonne to Luchon,

Stage 9
3 July 1925 — Luchon to Perpignan,

References

1925 Tour de France
Tour de France stages